Sea Devils is a 1953 colour British–American historical adventure film, directed by Raoul Walsh and starring Rock Hudson, Yvonne De Carlo, and Maxwell Reed. The story is based on Victor Hugo's novel Toilers of the Sea which was the working title of the film. The scenes at sea were shot around the Channel Islands, and much of the rest of the film was shot on location in those islands as well.

Plot
The year is 1800, and Britain and France have been at war since 1798, in what later was to be known as the War of the Second Coalition. Gilliatt, a fisherman-turned-smuggler on Guernsey, agrees to transport a beautiful woman, Drouchette, to the French coast on his ship the Sea Devil. Drouchette tells him that she intends to organise the rescue of her brother from a French prison. Gilliatt finds himself falling in love and so feels betrayed when he later learns that Drouchette is a countess helping Napoleon plan an invasion of Great Britain. However, in reality she is a British agent working to thwart this invasion. Not knowing this, and believing her a French spy, Gilliat kidnaps her and takes her back to Guernsey. He takes her to Lethiery and accuses her of being a French spy. However Lethiery had organised the whole thing so instead of imprisoning her he returns her to France.

Gilliat worries that she will hang but spots Rantain escorting her to his boat at night. He slips by them and swims out to Raintain's boat and knocks out his partner, Blasquito. Gil thinks she is being taken to England to be hanged. However Gil is overpowered and himself tied up below deck. Douchette stops short of telling him the truth but kisses him and says she loves him just before she disembarks in France. Anchored slightly off the coast Douchette swims the final 100m and goes back to the bed she was kidnapped from.

Rantain takes Gil back to Guernsey but both end in prison.

Pretending nothing happened in the night Douchette meets Fouche. Fouche discovers that all the staff at the chateau were replaced just before the Countess (Douchette) arrived. He becomes suspicious. He invites the elderly Baron to Boudrec to the chateau to confirm her identity.

Napoleon visits the chateau and explains his invasion plan to his generals. Douchette listens in through a communication trumpet. the Baron arrives and tricks her with a question about his long-dead son. Fouche locks her in the dungeon of the chateau. A carrier pigeon takes news to Lethierry in Guernsey. He releases Gil on condition that he rescues her. He agrees.

However, Gil has to take his rival Rantain as an aide. A coded message is sent to Douchette but is intercepted. Foche contrives to let her escape but be secretly followed. She heads to the cafe where Gil does his brandy collections. Gil waits with the cafe owner. Back on his ship Rantain overpowers Willie. He goes to the cafe and gets the owner to tie up Gil. He is about to kill Gil when Willie enters and kills him instead. Douchette appears but the cafe is surrounded by French soldiers. The soldiers pursue them to the coast. He leads the soldiers off while she swims to the boat. Gil then swims to join her.

Cast
Rock Hudson as Gilliatt ("Gil")
Yvonne De Carlo as Drouchette
Maxwell Reed as Rantaine
Denis O'Dea as Lethierry
Michael Goodliffe as Ragan
Bryan Forbes as Willie
Jacques B. Brunius as Fouche
Ivor Barnard as Benson
Arthur Wontner as Baron de Baudrec
Gérard Oury as Napoleon
Larry Taylor as Blasquito
Keith Pyott as General Latour
Reed De Rouen as Customs man
 Michael Mulcaster as Coastguard skipper
 Rene Poirier as Duprez

Production
The film was originally titled Toilers of the Sea, from the novel by Victor Hugo which formed the basis of Borden Chase's screenplay. The novel was changed substantially and Hugo is not credited; Borden Chase is given a credit for story and screenplay.

The film was made by a British independent company, Coronado Productions, belonging to producer David Rose.

The female lead was originally offered to Joan Fontaine who turned it down. She was replaced by Yvonne de Carlo, whose casting meant she had to postpone a film she was going to make for Edward Small, Savage Frontier. Her co-star was Rock Hudson, on loan from Universal; Hudson and de Carlo had previously made Scarlet Angel together.

Rose arranged for the film to be distributed through RKO. The director was Raoul Walsh who had just made Blackbeard the Pirate (1952) for RKO.

Filming started August 1952 on location on the Channel Islands. There was also shooting in Saint-Malo, France. Walsh fell into the sea during shooting one scene and had to take two days off to recover.

De Carlo was having an affair with Aly Khan during filming.

Bryan Forbes plays Rock Hudson's sidekick. The role was meant to be played by Barry Fitzgerald but Forbes had befriended Walsh during the making of The World in His Arms (1952) which Walsh directed and Forbes appeared in. Walsh insisted Forbes play the role, and that Forbes help rewrite the part for a younger actor. Forbes later wrote: "The finished film now...reminds me both of happy times and, less agreeably, my ludicrous performance in a fairly ludicrous film."

Richard Addinsell wrote the music.

The film was completed and copyrighted in 1952 but released early in 1953.

Trivia

Victor Hugo lived on Guernsey, hence its being the setting of the story. Lethierry's house in the film appears to be Hugo's house (or a copy).

Although not critical to the plot the script includes some geographical inaccuracies: when Gilliat leaves Guernsey with Douchette he tells his partner Willie  to steer South by South West instead of South East, with the intention of going to an island instead of France. However Guernsey is so close to France that both these directions hit the French coast.

The script also refers to the "Emperor Napoleon": Napoleon did not become Emperor until 1804.

References

External links

1953 films
British historical adventure films
1950s historical adventure films
French Revolutionary Wars films
Films directed by Raoul Walsh
Films set in 1800
Films set in Guernsey
Films set in France
Films based on French novels
Films based on works by Victor Hugo
Napoleonic Wars naval films
Seafaring films
Films scored by Richard Addinsell
1950s English-language films
1950s British films